Mike Wendling is a BBC journalist and author of the book Alt-Right: From 4chan to the White House.
He is editor of BBC Trending and was part of the team which covered the 2016 U.S. presidential election.
In 2016, Wendling wrote about subjects including American right-wing social media star Tomi Lahren and a factory that was the first to outsource jobs away from the United States.

He was also contacted by the American terrorist Joshua Ryne Goldberg, and interviewed antifa activists and Proud Boys members in Portland, Oregon.

He is based in London and is originally from western New York State.

References 

Year of birth missing (living people)
Living people
American political journalists
British political journalists
21st-century American writers
21st-century English writers
21st-century British journalists
20th-century British journalists
English male journalists
20th-century English non-fiction writers
BBC newsreaders and journalists